Presidential elections were held in El Salvador on 14 January 1923. The result was a victory for Alfonso Quiñónez Molina, who received around 178,000 votes. His opponent Miguel Tomás Molina called on his supporters to boycott the election.

References

Bibliography
Anderson, Thomas P. (1971) Matanza: El Salvador's communist revolt of 1932 Lincoln: University of Nebraska Press.
Callardo, Ricardo (1961) Las constituciones de El Salvador. I-II Madrid: Ediciones Cultura Hispanica
Larde y Larín, Jorge (1958) Guía Histórica de El Salvador San Salvador: Ministerio de Culture
Vidal, Manuel (1970) Nociones de historia de Centro América San Salvador: Ministerio de Educación. Ninth edition
Webre, Stephen (1979) José Napoleón Duarte and the Christian Democratic Party in Salvadoran Politics 1960-1972 Baton Rouge: Louisiana State University Press

El Salvador
Presidential elections in El Salvador
1923 in El Salvador
Election and referendum articles with incomplete results